Amuze was a video game studio located in Solna, Sweden. The studio was founded in 1996 by John Kroknes and Stefan Holmqvist. Amuze is best known for developing the game Headhunter and its sequel Headhunter Redemption.

Games
Amuze released two games in the Headhunter series of video games published by SEGA. The sequel, Headhunter Redemption, was released in 2004.

Headhunter
Headhunter is a video game developed by Amuze for the Sega Dreamcast and PlayStation 2 video game consoles. The Dreamcast version of the game was only distributed in Europe by BigBen Interactive.

For the majority of the game, the gameplay is that of a third-person shooter as players control protagonist Jack Wade. Jack travels between the main levels of the game on his motorcycle, and these sections take the form of a racing game, with the motorbike's acceleration and braking controlled using the sensitive analogue trigger buttons of the Dreamcast control pad.

Music for the game was composed by Richard Jacques and recorded at Abbey Road Studios.

Headhunter Redemption
Headhunter Redemption is the sequel to the Dreamcast and PlayStation 2 game Headhunter. Headhunter Redemption was launched in Europe for the Xbox and PlayStation 2 on October 31, 2003. The game was released in North America on September 21, 2004.

Set 20 years after the Bloody Mary Virus (released in the Original Headhunter), Jack and His New Partner Leeza X find out something is amidst when they try to stop Weapon Smugglers. The pair must face opposition from the Glass Skyscrapers filled and media controlled 'Above' and The Dregs & Criminal Infested colonies of 'Below.' Jack and Leeza must also face their fears as they try to redeem a world from chaos, Especially Jack, whose son was taken away by forces from 'Below,' but might still be alive.

Closure
Headhunter Redemption marked the last of the studio's games as they would later close down the Stockholm studio after a period of economic hardship in 2005. O-Zone was going to be the studio's next gen title but was not finished before the studio shuttered.

The official website was active, but not updated, for a period after the Stockholm studio closed in spring 2005. The website went offline in fall 2008. On its most productive year of 2003, Amuze employed 70+ staff in-house.

See also
Headhunter (video game)
Headhunter Redemption

References

Video game publishers
Video game companies established in 1996
Video game companies disestablished in 2005
Defunct video game companies of Sweden
Video game development companies
Swedish companies established in 1996
2005 disestablishments in Sweden